Jill Gallard  is a British diplomat who took up the post of British Ambassador to Germany in November 2020. Previously she was the British Ambassador to Portugal, director of human resources at the Foreign and Commonwealth Office and deputy political director at the Foreign and Commonwealth Office.

Early life
Born in Omagh, Northern Ireland, and raised in Omagh and County Antrim, Gallard was educated at Ballyclare High School and gained a MA degree in French and Spanish from the University of Edinburgh.

Career
Gallard joined the Foreign and Commonwealth Office (FCO) in 1991. She has served at Madrid and Prague and in various posts at the FCO, including at the European Commission in Brussels. She was Ambassador to Portugal from 2011 to 2014 and director of human resources at the FCO from 2014 to 2018.

Gallard was appointed CMG in the 2018 Birthday Honours.

From 2018 to 2020 she was deputy political director and director of the Western Balkans and Eastern Mediterranean at the FCO.

In July 2020 Gallard was appointed Ambassador to Germany and took up the position in November. She was the first ever woman to hold the position.

Personal life
Gallard is married and has two children. She is multilingual.

References

1968 births
Living people
Alumni of the University of Edinburgh
British women ambassadors
Ambassadors of the United Kingdom to Portugal
Ambassadors of the United Kingdom to Germany
People from Omagh